The Basilica of the Good Lord Jesus AKA Basilica of Tremembé is a Catholic church located in the city of Tremembé, São Paulo in the south of Brazil.

The image of Good Lord Jesus of Tremembe is carved in wood and for the Catholic Church is a prominent religious artifact.

The church of Bom Jesus de tremembé began as a chapel built by Manoel da Costa Cabral on his farm in the then town of Taubaté, in the place called Tremembé, in 1672.

The chapel was expanded in 1795. In 1907 the parish of Lord Buen Jesús de Tremembé was created, receiving the title of archdiocesan Sanctuary as reported on the site of the basilica.

In 1974, Pope Paul VI, recognized the value of the church granting him the title of Minor Basilica.

See also
Roman Catholicism in Brazil
Good Lord Jesus

References

Basilica churches in Brazil
Roman Catholic churches completed in 1672
Roman Catholic churches in São Paulo (state)
17th-century Roman Catholic church buildings in Brazil